The term two dots or double dot may refer to:

Orthography
 Colon (punctuation), the punctuation mark
 Two dots (diacritic), a mark used with a base letter to indicate that its pronunciation is somehow modified
  Diaeresis (diacritic), the diacritic mark used to denote the separation of two consecutive vowels
 Umlaut (diacritic), the diacritic mark to indicate the vowel-fronting sound change
Metal umlaut, gratuitous diacritic used in the names of some rock bands
 Ethiopic wordspace, a word divider in Geʽez script
 Question mark#History, two vertical dots used to indicate a question in fifth century Syriac manuscripts

Other
 Two Dots (game), a puzzle game for Android and IOS
 Leader (typography) Row of dots used in tables of contents (usually more than two)
 Ellipsis (computer programming), a notation (two or three dots) is used to denote programming ranges, an unspecified number of arguments
 A parent directory in a relative path
 A second derivative in Newton's notation

See also
 Semi-colon, the punctuation mark
 Dot (disambiguation)
 Three dots (disambiguation)